Philip E. Eaton (born 1936) is a Professor Emeritus of Chemistry at the University of Chicago. He and his fellow researchers were the first to synthesize the "impossible" cubane molecule in 1964.

Working with Mao-Xi Zhang he is reported as having been the first to make octanitrocubane (their paper was published in the year 2003) Because of its eight nitro groups and highly strained C-C bonds - octanitrocubane is a very powerful high explosive.

Early years
Philip E. Eaton was born in 1936 in Brooklyn, New York. When Eaton was seven his family relocated to Budd Lake, New Jersey. Here he began attending Roxbury Grammar School and later Roxbury High School. It was during these high school years that he began to find his passion for science. It was the support of his parents and teachers that made him decide to major in chemistry.

Education
Eaton attended Princeton University seeking a major in chemistry. Eaton received his B.A. in 1957 before attending Harvard University and earning his M.A. in 1960 and Ph.D. in 1961. During his time in school he became familiar with cage chemistry, specifically Kepone.

Teaching experience
Upon graduating from Harvard Eaton accepted an assistant professorship position at the University of California, Berkeley. During this time he taught introductory organic chemistry. In 1962, he transferred to the University of Chicago where he remains today.

Research
After arriving at University of Chicago Eaton began his research which he is now most well known for, cubane synthesis. In 1964 Eaton and Thomas W. Cole Jr. synthesized the "impossible" cubane molecule. It was given this name because of its unusual cubic geometry. Many scientists believed that the 90 degree bond-angles would be too strained to allow this molecule to form. He later studied larger prismanes.

Awards
 Alfred P. Sloan Foundation Fellow (1963)
 Research Award, Rohm and Haas Company (1975)
 Alexander von Humboldt Prize (1985)
 Alan Berman Research Rublication Award, Naval Research Laboratory, U.S. Navy (1995)
 Arthur C. Cope Scholar Award, American Chemical Society (1997)

References

External links
 
 
 Home page at Chicago University
 http://www.synarchive.com/syn/14
 http://chronicle.uchicago.edu/000302/octa.shtml

1936 births
Living people
University of Chicago faculty
Organic chemists
Harvard University alumni
Princeton University alumni
People from Brooklyn